Tall Girl 2 is a 2022 American teen romantic comedy film directed by Emily Ting from a screenplay by Sam Wolfson. The film stars Ava Michelle, Sabrina Carpenter, Griffin Gluck, and Steve Zahn. It is the sequel to the 2019 film Tall Girl. The film was released on February 11, 2022 and received mixed reviews.

Plot 
The relationship between Jodi and Dunkleman begins on a lovely note, with the two sharing romantic moments. Jodi has become one of the well known kids at school as a result of her speech at the Homecoming dance, who high-fives other students instead of staring down the hallways.

Her newfound fame and her new desire of appearing in the Spring musical, however, prove to be huge roadblocks in her otherwise smooth relationship with Dunkleman. She finds herself fighting her own fears and dealing with anxiety attacks. After landing the lead part of Kim in the musical ‘Bye Bye Birdie’, Jodi is bewildered. Her insecurities are calling to her through a voice within her head. Tommy plays the lead opposite Jodie in Bye Bye Birdie and is a possible new love interest of her.

Jodi deals with typical adolescent issues. She carries a lot of weight on her shoulders between the boy she’s dating, her friendships, bullying, the musical, and her uncomfortable parents. She is under a great deal of stress and feels completely overwhelmed.

By focusing on her confidence, Jodi eventually discovers a means to filter out that negative voice. She makes the decision to govern her mind rather than the other way around. Her parents go above and beyond to ensure that their children succeed.

Meanwhile, others are struggling with their own insecurities, while Jodi is battling negative thoughts in her head.

Harper, Jodi’s sister, is attempting to prove that she is capable of more than just competing in beauty pageants. Fareeda wishes for her parents to believe in her goals of becoming a fashion designer. Dunkleman’s connection with Jodi is often questioned.

Jodi has been troubled by an inner voice that tells her she’s not good enough since the beginning of rehearsals, as well as the bully Kimmy, who she beat to the lead role and is now determined to ensure Jodi flakes out.

Kimmy wants to enlist Schnipper in her plots, but he refuses since he has a crush on Jodi as a result of their kiss in the first film. Kimmy finds out that she doesn’t have to do much to upset Jodi, and her first week of rehearsals doesn’t go as planned, despite Tommy’s assurances.

The strain eventually takes its toll on Jodi’s relationship when Jack, who, after promising her she can skip their anniversary dinner to rehearse, becomes enraged when she actually does. They part soon after, and Jodi becomes close to Tommy, with whom she shares a kiss one night.

Jodi appears to reconcile with Jack, but when she admits that she kissed someone while they were still together, Jack reacts angrily, and the two break up for good. He makes a contract with Stig’s sister Stella, who is going through her own break-up, and swears to never see her again.

Jodi participates in the pre-show practice of a “burning ceremony”, which purges the cast of any negativity before the performance. She intends to set fire to the shoes Jack gave her in the first film, but she changes her mind halfway through. Kimmy is the one who saves them from the fire, which marks the beginning of her bully redemption.

Despite the fact that he is interested in her, Jodi admits to Tommy that she is still not over Jack, and the two agree to merely be friends.

Jodi gives Fareeda her blessing to date Stig at the pre-opening night celebration, and Jack appears to give Jodi a pep talk. Stella also gives him a long-overdue scolding for his reaction to Jodi’s kiss with Tommy.

Despite her parents’ guidance on how to deal with nervousness, Jodi is still having trouble with her inner voice on the opening night of the show. Kimmy completes her redemption by declining Jodi’s offer to take her place on stage, instead telling Jodi that she will wait in the wings and provide signals if she forgets anything.

Opening night is a success, and after the show, Jodi finally silences her inner critic by reminding herself, that she is good enough to do this. When Jack arrives, he discloses that he has been photographing in the lighting booth all night.

Jack confesses his love for Jodi, and the two reconcile and kiss, ensuring that everyone lives happily ever after.

Cast

Production
On December 1, 2020, Netflix selected Sam Wolfson to write a Tall Girl sequel, with Ava Michelle set to return as Jodi. Principal photography began on April 12, 2021, and concluded on May 21, 2021, in New Orleans, Louisiana. The film was released on February 11, 2022.

Reception
On review aggregator Rotten Tomatoes, the film has an approval rating of 63% based on 8 reviews, with an average rating of 5.0/10.

References

External links 

2022 romantic comedy films
2020s high school films
2020s teen comedy films
2020s teen romance films
American high school films
American romantic comedy films
American teen comedy films
American teen romance films
Films about beauty pageants
English-language Netflix original films
Films set in New Orleans
Films shot in New Orleans
Human height
Wonderland Sound and Vision films
2020s English-language films
2020s American films